East Hill Historic District is a national historic district located at Springville in Erie County, New York. The district encompasses 59 contributing buildings and 2 contributing objects in the original residential district of the village of Springville.  The district includes a variety of residential buildings built between about 1835 and 1935. It includes notable examples of Greek Revival, Italianate, Queen Anne, Colonial Revival, and Bungalow / American Craftsman style architecture.  Notable buildings include the George E. Crandall House / Warner Museum (c. 1849), Frank O. Smith House (c. 1890), C.J. Shuttleworth House (c. 1870), Morris Hall House (1892), and Inez Wiggins House (c. 1935).

It was listed on the National Register of Historic Places in 2015.

References

Historic districts on the National Register of Historic Places in New York (state)
Greek Revival architecture in New York (state)
Italianate architecture in New York (state)
Colonial Revival architecture in New York (state)
Historic districts in Erie County, New York
National Register of Historic Places in Erie County, New York